Catalina Elena Escobar Gómez (born 21 September 1990) is a Colombian artistic gymnast and part of the national team.

She participated at the 2009 and 2010 World Artistic Gymnastics Championships in Rotterdam, the Netherlands.

References

External links
https://www.youtube.com/watch?v=Yl2ddU9jYfY
https://thegymter.net/catalina-escobar/
http://www.panamatoday.com/sports/colombian-catalina-escobar-another-injured-gymnastics-1086

1990 births
Living people
Colombian female artistic gymnasts
Place of birth missing (living people)
Gymnasts at the 2011 Pan American Games
Gymnasts at the 2016 Summer Olympics
Olympic gymnasts of Colombia
Pan American Games medalists in gymnastics
Pan American Games bronze medalists for Colombia
South American Games gold medalists for Colombia
South American Games silver medalists for Colombia
South American Games bronze medalists for Colombia
South American Games medalists in gymnastics
Competitors at the 2006 South American Games
Competitors at the 2010 South American Games
Medalists at the 2011 Pan American Games
21st-century Colombian women